The providence petrel (Pterodroma solandri) is a large and heavy build gadfly petrel that nests in two locations in the Tasman Sea: Lord Howe Island (some 800 km from the Australian mainland) and Philip Island.

This bird was once numerous on Norfolk Island, however an estimated 1 million birds were harvested for food, and was completely exterminated on this island by 1800. 

This species is classified as least concern however the providence petrel is deemed to be in a precarious disposition because its breeding is confined to two mountain tops and one tiny islet, and is therefore at great risk from a catastrophe. 

Graceful and supple in flight, the providence petrel has a cumbersome propensity on the ground, making it vulnerable to attack by predators. Main in causes of death are predation by the endangered Lord Howe rail and flooding of burrows. Other dangers include rat predation and drowning in longline fishing gear. The current population is estimated at only 64,000.

The scientific name of this species was given in honour of the Swedish botanist Daniel Solander, with Solander's petrel being an alternative common name.

References

External links
BirdLife species factsheet

Pterodroma
Birds of Lord Howe Island
Birds described in 1844